Richard Cory may refer to:

 "Richard Cory", a poem by Edwin Arlington Robinson
 Richard Cory (song), a song by Simon and Garfunkel, based on the poem

See also
Richard Cory-Wright
Cory (surname)